Mary Alice Quinn (December 28, 1920 - November 8, 1935) was a girl from Chicago, Illinois, who died at the age of 14 from a chronic heart condition. She was reportedly a devout Catholic, who said prayers daily to St. Therese of Liseaux, and her gravesite at Holy Sepulchre Cemetery in Alsip, Illinois is an unofficial pilgrimage destination. She has been described as "Chicago's Miracle Child" and "Chicago's Unofficial Saint".

References

External links

1920 births
1935 deaths
People from Chicago
Catholics from Illinois